J. Rogers Pope is an American politician from the state of Louisiana. A Republican, Pope has represented the 13th district of the Louisiana State Senate, covering parts of Livingston Parish, since 2020. Pope formerly represented the 71st district of the Louisiana House of Representatives from 2008 until 2020.

Career
Pope is a former Livingston Parish Schools Superintendent, and continues to serve as the Executive Director of the Louisiana Association of School Executives. Pope won election to the Louisiana House of Representatives for the 71st district in 2007, narrowly defeating fellow Republican John Ware. He was re-elected unopposed in 2011 and 2015.

When he was term-limited from the House of Representatives in 2019, Pope ran instead for the 13th district of the Louisiana State Senate. He was elected in the first round with an outright majority of 50.4%, defeating fellow Republicans Edith Carlin and Deven Cavalier. Pope assumed his Senate seat in 2020.

Personal life
Pope lives in Denham Springs with his wife, Pat. They have two grown children and six grandchildren.

References

Living people
People from Denham Springs, Louisiana
Republican Party Louisiana state senators
Republican Party members of the Louisiana House of Representatives
21st-century American politicians
Southeastern Louisiana University alumni
Year of birth missing (living people)